Nothofagus, also known as the southern beeches, is a genus of 43 species of trees and shrubs native to the Southern Hemisphere in southern South America (Chile, Argentina) and Australasia (east and southeast Australia, New Zealand, New Guinea, and New Caledonia). The species are ecological dominants in many temperate forests in these regions. Some species are reportedly naturalised in Germany and Great Britain. The genus has a rich fossil record of leaves, cupules, and pollen, with fossils extending into the late Cretaceous period and occurring in Australia, New Zealand, Antarctica, and South America.

Description
The leaves are toothed or entire, evergreen or deciduous. The fruit is a small, flattened or triangular nut, borne in cupules containing one to seven nuts.

Reproduction
Many individual trees are extremely old, and at one time, some populations were thought to be unable to reproduce in present-day conditions where they were growing, except by suckering (clonal reproduction), being remnant forest from a cooler time. Sexual reproduction has since been shown to be possible.

Taxonomy
The genus Nothofagus was first formally described in 1850 by Carl Ludwig Blume who published the description in his book Museum botanicum Lugduno-Batavum, sive, Stirpium exoticarum novarum vel minus cognitarum ex vivis aut siccis brevis expositio et descriptio.

In the past, they were included in the family Fagaceae, but genetic tests revealed them to be genetically distinct, and they are now included in their own family, Nothofagaceae.

Species list
The following is a list of species, hybrids and varieties accepted by the Plants of the World Online as at April 2020:
Nothofagus aequilateralis (Baum.-Bod.) Steenis (New Caledonia)
Nothofagus alessandri Espinosa (Central Chile)
Nothofagus alpina (Poepp. & Endl.) Oerst. (Argentina South, Chile Central, Chile South)
Nothofagus antarctica (G.Forst.) Oerst. (Argentina South, Chile Central, Chile South)
Nothofagus balansae (Baill.) Steenis (New Caledonia)
Nothofagus baumanniae (Baum.-Bod.) Steenis (New Caledonia)
Nothofagus betuloides (Mirb.) Oerst. (Argentina South, Chile South)
Nothofagus brassii Steenis (New Guinea)
Nothofagus carrii Steenis (New Guinea)
Nothofagus cliffortioides (Hook.f.) Oerst. (New Zealand North, New Zealand South)
Nothofagus codonandra (Hook.f.) Oerst. (New Caledonia)
Nothofagus crenata Steenis (New Guinea)
Nothofagus cunninghamii (Hook.f.) Oerst. (Tasmania, Victoria)
Nothofagus discoidea (Baum.-Bod.) Steenis (New Caledonia)
Nothofagus dombeyi (Mirb.) Oerst. (Argentina South, Chile Central, Chile South)
Nothofagus flaviramea Steenis (New Guinea)
Nothofagus fusca (Hook.f.) Oerst. (New Zealand North, New Zealand South)
Nothofagus glauca (Phil.) Krasser (Chile Central)
Nothofagus grandis Steenis (New Guinea)
Nothofagus gunnii (Hook.f.) Oerst. (Tasmania)
Nothofagus macrocarpa (A.DC.) F.M.Vázquez & R.A.Rodr. (Chile Central)
Nothofagus menziesii (Hook.f.) Oerst. (New Zealand North, New Zealand South)
Nothofagus moorei [F.Muell.) Krasser (New South Wales, Queensland)
Nothofagus nitida (Phil.) Krasser (Chile South)
Nothofagus nuda Steenis (New Guinea)
Nothofagus obliqua (Mirb.) Oerst. (Argentina South, Chile Central, Chile South)
Nothofagus perryi Steenis (New Guinea)
Nothofagus pseudoresinosa Steenis (New Guinea)
Nothofagus pullei Steenis (New Guinea)
Nothofagus pumilio (Poepp. & Endl.) Krasser (Argentina South, Chile Central, Chile South)
Nothofagus resinosa Steenis (New Guinea)
Nothofagus rubra Steenis (New Guinea)
Nothofagus rutila Ravenna (Chile Central)
Nothofagus solandri (Hook.f.) Oerst. (New Zealand North, New Zealand South)
Nothofagus starkenborghii Steenis (Bismarck Archipelago, New Guinea)
Nothofagus stylosa Steenis (New Guinea)
Nothofagus truncata (Colenso) Cockayne (New Zealand North, New Zealand South)
Nothofagus womersleyi Steenis (New Guinea)
Nothofagus × apiculata (Colenso) Cockayne (New Zealand North, New Zealand South)
Nothofagus × blairii Kirk (New Zealand North, New Zealand South)
Nothofagus × dodecaphleps Mike L.Grant & E.J.Clement
Nothofagus × eugenananus Gilland.
Nothofagus × leoni Espinosa (Chile Central)
Nothofagus × solfusca Allan (New Zealand North)
Nothofagus var. crenata Steenis (New Guinea)
Nothofagus var. sapeii Steenis (New Guinea)

Subgenera
Four subgenera are recognized, based on morphology and DNA analysis:
 Subgenus Fuscospora, six species (N. alessandri, N. cliffortioides, N. fusca, N. gunnii, N. solandri, and N. truncata) in New Zealand, Tasmania, and southern South America.
 Subgenus Lophozonia, seven species (N. alpina, N. cunninghamii, N. glauca, N. macrocarpa, N. menziesii, N. moorei, and N. obliqua) in New Zealand, Australia, and southern South America.
 Subgenus Nothofagus, five species (N. antarctica, N. betuloides, N. dombeyi, N. nitida, and N. pumilio) in southern South America. 
 Subgenus Brassospora (or Trisyngyne), 25 species (N. aequilateralis, N. balansae, N. baumanniae, N. bernhardii, N. brassii, N. carrii, N. codonandra, N. cornuta, N. crenata, N. decipiens, N. discoidea, N. dura, N. eymae, N. flaviramea, N. grandis, N. nuda, N. perryi, N. pseudoresinosa, N, pullei, N. recurva, N. resinosa, N. rubra, N. starkenborghii, N. stylosa, and N. womersleyi) in New Guinea and New Caledonia.

In 2013, Peter Brian Heenan and Rob D. Smissen proposed splitting the genus into four, turning the four recognized subgenera into the new genera Fuscospora, Lophozonia and Trisyngyne, with the five South American species of subgenus Nothofagus remaining in genus Nothofagus. The proposed new genera are not accepted at the World Checklist of Selected Plant Families.

Extinct species
The following additional species are listed as extinct:<ref>{{cite journal | last1 = Carpenter | first1 = RJ | last2 = Bannister | first2 = JM | last3 = Lee | first3 = DE | last4 = Jordan | first4 = GJ | year = 2014 | title = Nothofagus subgenus Brassospora (Nothofagaceae) leaf fossils from New Zealand: A link to Australia and New Guinea? | journal = Botanical Journal of the Linnean Society | volume = 174 | issue = 4| pages = 503–515 | doi=10.1111/boj.12143}}</ref>
†Nothofagus australis (Argentina, Early Oligocene-Early Miocene)
†Nothofagus balfourensis (Tasmania, Late Oligocene-Early Miocene)
†Nothofagus beardmorensis (Antarctica, Late Pliocene)
†Nothofagus bulbosa (Tasmania, Early Oligocene)
†Nothofagus cethanica (Tasmania, Early Oligocene)
†Nothofagus cooksoniae (Tasmania, Early Oligocene)
†Nothofagus crenulata (Argentina, Mid Oligocene-Early Miocene)
†Nothofagus cretacea (Antarctica, Late Cretaceous)
†Nothofagus densinervosa (Argentina, Mid Oligocene-Early Miocene)
†Nothofagus elongata (Argentina, Early Oligocene-Early Miocene)
†Nothofagus glandularis (Tasmania, Mid Oligocene-Early Miocene)
†Nothofagus glaucifolia (Antarctica, Late Cretaceous)
†Nothofagus lanceolata (Argentina, Late Oligocene-Early Miocene)
†Nothofagus lobata (Tasmania, Early Oligocene)
†Nothofagus magelhaenica (Argentina, Early Oligocene-Early Miocene)
†Nothofagus magellanica (Argentina, Late Oligocene-Mid Miocene)
†Nothofagus maideni (Tasmania, Early Oligocene-Mid Miocene)
†Nothofagus microphylla (Tasmania, Late Oligocene-Mid Miocene)
†Nothofagus mucronata (Tasmania, Early Oligocene)
†Nothofagus muelleri (New South Wales, Late Eocene)
†Nothofagus novae-zealandiae (New Zealand, Mid-Late Miocene)
†Nothofagus pachyphylla (Tasmania, Early Pleistocene)
†Nothofagus palustris (New Zealand, Late Oligocene-Early Miocene)
†Nothofagus peduncularis (Tasmania, Early Oligocene)
†Nothofagus robusta (Tasmania, Early Oligocene)
†Nothofagus serrata (Tasmania, Early Oligocene)
†Nothofagus serrulata (Argentina, Mid Oligocene-Early Miocene)
†Nothofagus simplicidens (Argentina, Mid Oligocene-Early Miocene)
†Nothofagus smithtonensis (Tasmania, Early Oligocene)
†Nothofagus tasmanica (Tasmania, Eocene-Early Oligocene)
†Nothofagus ulmifolia (Antarctica, Late Cretaceous)
†Nothofagus variabilis (Argentina, Oligocene)
†Nothofagus zastawniakiae (Antarctica, Late Cretaceous)

Distribution
The pattern of distribution around the southern Pacific Rim suggests the dissemination of the genus dates to the time when Antarctica, Australia, and South America were connected in a common land-mass or supercontinent referred to as Gondwana. However, genetic evidence using molecular dating methods has been used to argue that the species in New Zealand and New Caledonia evolved from species that arrived in these landmasses by dispersal across oceans. Uncertainty exists in molecular dates and controversy rages as to whether the distribution of Nothofagus derives from the break-up of Gondwana (i.e. vicariance), or if long-distance dispersal has occurred across oceans. In South America, the northern limit of the genus can be construed as La Campana National Park and the Vizcachas Mountains in the central part of Chile.

 Evolutionary history Nothofagus first appeared in Antarctica during the early Campanian stage (83.6 to 72.1 million years ago) of the Late Cretaceous. During the Campanian Nothofagus diversified and became dominant within Antarctic ecosystems, with the appearance of all four modern subgenera by the end of the stage. Nothofagus shows a progressive decline in the Antarctic pollen record through the Maastrichtian, before substantially recovering after the Cretaceous-Paleogene boundary. Nothofagus persisted in Antarctica deep into the Cenozoic, despite the increasingly inhospitable conditions, with the final records from the late Neogene, around 15-5 million years old, which were small tundra-adapted prostrate shrubs, similar to Salix arctica (Arctic willow).Nothofagus first appeared in southern South America during the late Campanian. During the Paleocene and Eocene they were mostly restricted to southern Patagonia, before reaching a peak abundance during the Miocene. Their distribution contracted westwards during the late Miocene due to the aridification of Patagonia.

Although the genus now mostly occurs in cool, isolated, high-altitude environments at temperate and tropical latitudes, the fossil record shows that it survived in climates that appear to be much warmer than those that Nothofagus now occupies.

EcologyNothofagus species are used as food plants by the larvae of hepialid moths of the genus Aenetus, including A. eximia and A. virescens. Zelopsis nothofagi is a leaf hopper, endemic to New Zealand, which is found on Nothofagus.Cyttaria is genus of ascomycete fungi found on or associated with Nothofagus in Australia and South America. Misodendrum are specialist parasitic plants found on various species of Nothofagus in South America.

The species of subgenus Brassospora are evergreen, and distributed in the tropics of New Guinea, New Britain, and New Caledonia. In New Guinea and New Britain Nothofagus is characteristic of lower montane rain forests between 1000 and 2500 meters elevation, occurring infrequently at elevations as low as 600 meters and in upper montane forests between 2500 and 3150 meters elevation. Nothofagus is most commonly found above the Castanopsis-Lithocarpus zone in the lower montane forests, and below the conifer-dominated upper montane forests. Nothofagus grows in mixed stands with trees of other species or in pure stands, particularly on ridge crests and upper slopes. The Central Range has the greatest diversity of species, with fewer species distributed among the mountains of western and northern New Guinea, New Britain, and Goodenough and Normanby islands.

The New Caledonian species are endemic to the main island (Grand Terre), most commonly on soils derived from ultramafic rocks between 150 to 1350 meters elevation. They occur in isolated stands, forming a low or stunted and irregular and fairly open canopy. The conifers Agathis and Araucaria are sometimes present as emergents, rising 10 to 20 meters above the Nothofagus canopy.

Beech mast
Every four to six years or so, Nothofagus'' produces a heavier crop of seeds and is known as the beech mast. In New Zealand, the beech mast causes an increase in the population of introduced mammals such as mice, rats, and stoats. When the rodent population collapses, the stoats begin to prey on native bird species, many of which are threatened with extinction.  This phenomenon is covered in more detail in the article on stoats in New Zealand.

References

External Links

Nothofagaceae
Trees of New Zealand
Fagales genera
Extant Campanian first appearances
Taxa named by Carl Ludwig Blume